
Gmina Huszlew is a rural gmina (administrative district) in Łosice County, Masovian Voivodeship, in east-central Poland.

Villages
Gmina Huszlew contains the villages and settlements of Bachorza, Dziadkowskie, Dziadkowskie-Folwark, Felin, Harachwosty, Huszlew, Juniewicze, Kopce, Kownaty, Krasna, Krasna-Kolonia, Krzywośnity, Ławy, Liwki Szlacheckie, Liwki Włościańskie, Makarówka, Mostów, Nieznanki, Sewerynów, Siliwonki, Waśkowólka, Władysławów, Wygoda, Zienie and Żurawlówka.

Neighbouring gminas
Gmina Huszlew is bordered by the gminas of Biała Podlaska, Leśna Podlaska, Łosice, Międzyrzec Podlaski, Olszanka and Stara Kornica.

References

Polish official population figures 2006

Huszlew
Łosice County